Mananara Nord National Park is a national park near Mananara Nord in the Analanjirofo Region of Madagascar. The closest city is Toamasina.

It also includes a marine park of 1000 ha near the village Sahasoa, with 3 islands, 3.5 km off Sahasoa: Nosy Antafana, Nosy Hely and Nosy Rangontsy.
On Nosy Antafana there is a campground near the springs.

Particular species:
Dypsis antanambensis, an endemic, threatened palm tree.
Voanioala gerardii, a rare coconut
Allocebus trichotis, a lemur only found near Mananara Nord river.

References

Analanjirofo
National parks of Madagascar
Madagascar lowland forests
Important Bird Areas of Madagascar